Jungle Brothers are an American hip hop trio composed of Michael Small (Mike Gee), Nathaniel Hall (Afrika Baby Bam), and Sammy Burwell (DJ Sammy B). Known as the pioneers of the fusion of jazz, hip-hop, and house music, they were the first hip-hop group to collaborate with a house-music producer. The trio released their debut album, Straight out the Jungle in July 1988. Their hip-house club hit single, "I'll House You" was added to the album in late-1988 reissues. Fostered by Kool DJ Red Alert, the Jungle Brothers success would pave the way for De La Soul, A Tribe Called Quest, and eventually the Native Tongues collective that they founded.

History
The group's first album, Straight out the Jungle, was released in 1988 on Warlock Records, an independent record label. Soon after they were signed by Warner Bros. Records, with whom the group released Done By the Forces of Nature in November 1989. In 1990, the Jungle Brothers contributed the song "I Get a Kick" to the Cole Porter tribute album "Red Hot + Blue" produced by the Red Hot Organization. Following a four-year break, the Jungle Brothers returned in 1993 with J Beez Wit the Remedy.

Jungle Brothers involved themselves with an emerging hip hop organization called Ill Crew Universal (ICU), which released worldwide compilation albums and supported independent hip hop artists. Their fifth album, V.I.P. was produced by Alex Gifford of Propellerheads and, during production, they added their vocal stylings to the Propellerheads tracks "Take California (And Party)" and "You Want It Back". Their latest album to contain new releases is 2002's All That We Do.

In 2001, the group's song "What's the Five 0" was featured in the music video game FreQuency.

In 2004, the Jungle Brothers joined with British producer Mr On to produce "Breathe (Don't Stop)", a version of "Breathe and Stop" by Q-Tip of A Tribe Called Quest, combined with a sample of Michael Jackson's "Don't Stop 'Til You Get Enough" (the idea was taken from a bootleg remix combining vocals from "Breathe and Stop" and music from "Don't Stop 'Til You Get Enough").

In 2005, the Jungle Brothers released a greatest hits and classic remixes and rarities double album, This Is..., which included remixes by The Wiseguys, Urban Takeover, Natural Born Chillers, and Stereo MCs.

Discography

Studio albums

Compilations
2005: This Is... (greatest hits)

Singles

As lead artist

Notes

References

External links
Official site
Jungle Brothers discography at Discogs 

Native Tongues Posse
Alternative hip hop groups
East Coast hip hop groups
Hip house music groups
Warlock Records artists
Warner Records artists
V2 Records artists
Gee Street Records artists
Musical groups established in 1987